Aslauga confusa is a butterfly in the family Lycaenidae. It is found in Cameroon, the Republic of the Congo and Gabon.

References

External links
Images representing Aslauga confusa at Barcodes of Life

Butterflies described in 1994
Aslauga